Cardigan is both a town and a community in the county of Ceredigion, Wales. Positioned on the tidal reach of the River Teifi at the point where Ceredigion meets Pembrokeshire, Cardigan was the county town of the historic county of Cardiganshire. Cardigan is the second-largest town in Ceredigion. The largest town, Aberystwyth, is one of the two administrative centres; the other is Aberaeron.

The settlement at Cardigan was developed around the Norman castle built in the late 11th or early 12th century. The castle was the location of the first National Eisteddfod in 1176. The town became an important port in the 18th century, but declined by the early 20th century owing to its shallow harbour. The castle underwent restoration in 2014.

The population in 2001 was 4,203, reducing slightly to 4,184 at the 2011 census.

Toponymy
Cardigan is an anglicisation of the Welsh  ("Ceredig's land"), the surrounding territory its Norman castle once controlled. Ceredig was supposedly one of the sons of Cunedda Wledig, who Welsh legend records invaded from the north to recover lands in Roman Britain from invading Irishmen in late antiquity.

The Welsh name  refers to its position by the mouth of the River Teifi.

History

Roman Britain 
The nearest known Roman forts were at Loventium and Bremia at the gold mines near Llanio above the River Teifi on the Sarn Helen road.

Middle ages 

The present town grew up near the medieval forts established to control the access of the Teifi and its confluents to Cardigan Bay on the Irish Sea. A castle was built by Roger de Montgomery in 1093 after a Norman army conquered Ceredigion. Its hinterland was regained by Owain Gwynedd, Cadwaladr ap Gruffydd, and Gruffydd ap Rhys in October 1136 after their victory at Crug Mawr over Norman forces army led by Roberts fitz Martin and fitz Stephen and Maurice FitzGerald. Rhys ap Gruffydd fortified the town and was credited with the establishment of the castle near the bridge over the Teifi. In 1176, he instituted the first eisteddfod. Contestants came from all over the British Isles to compete for chairs in music and poetry. Lord Rhys' grandson Maelgwn razed the castle and sacked the town.

In 1199 the town received its first charter and became an important trade centre. In 1227 a weekly market was established which continues to this day. Welsh rule over Cardigan continued, for some periods under royal lordship, until it was annexed to the English crown in 1283 when the country of Cardiganshire was created. The town wall was built in the 1240s and the castle was rebuilt. St Mary's Church was established as a Benedictine Priory and parish church in mediaeval times and survived the Dissolution of the Monasteries. The castle ceased being the administrative centre of the county with the Act of Union in 1536 and by the early 17th century was already falling into ruins.

Early modern period 

A small Benedictine priory operated until the Reformation and the more important abbey of St Dogmael's was also nearby. With Wales formally annexed by England through the Laws in Wales Acts, political and domestic stability boosted economic prosperity through the increase in maritime trade. At the end of the 16th century the port's principal trade was fishing, but over the next century trade expanded to include a range of imports and exports, and a Customs House was established to collect revenues.

During the Civil War, the town's castle was held for a time by the Royalists. In the 17th century, the residence erected around the old priory was famed as the home of Orinda (Catherine Philips), the friend of Jeremy Taylor.

The herring fishery developed and by the beginning of the 18th century there was a large merchant fleet. Exports included herring and salmon, slate, bark for tanning, corn and ale. Imports included oranges, manufactured goods, building materials and coal. Industries that developed included shipbuilding, brickworks, a foundry, ropemakers and sailmakers.

A county jail was erected in 1793.

In 1819, the ship Albion left Cardigan for New Brunswick, carrying the first Welsh settlers to Canada; on board were 27 Cardigan families, many of whom were farmers.

Town Centre 

In the 18th and early 19th century, Cardigan was the commercial centre of its county and the most important port in South Wales, exporting slate, oats, barley, and butter. In 1815, it possessed 314 ships totaling . This was seven times as many vessels as Cardiff and three times as many as Swansea. It had a thriving shipbuilding industry, with over 200 vessels being built both in Cardigan and downstream in the village of Llandudoch (St Dogmaels).  By mid-century, it was connected with the Welsh rail network but its harbour was obstructed by a sand bar that made it dangerous for vessels over 300 tons burden except during the high spring tides.

Rural industries and craftsmen were an important part of life in a country town. Information recorded in Trade Directories show that in 1830 there were  Thirteen boot makers, three bakers, one miller, four blacksmiths, seven carpenters, two coopers, six tailors, five dressmakers and milliners, two straw hat makers, two weavers, three curriers, three saddlers, two whitesmiths, four glaziers, five maltsters, two printers, two tanners and one stonemason. The houses were mostly of slate and the streets narrow, steep, and irregular, with a grammar school erected in 1804 and a national school in 1848. The town also had a public library.

Cardigan Guildhall was built between 1858 and 1860 on the site of the old grammar school and a house with a coach-house owned by Abraham Morgan. The cost of building was £1,880 5s for the front buildings, and £2,174 15s for the markets.

By the mid-19th century there were more than 60 taverns in the town. The decline of the port was hastened by the coming of the railway in 1886. The river silted up and larger vessels could no longer reach the port, which had largely become inactive by the early part of the 20th century. Some test dredging was carried out in 2009.

For the last 40 years of the 20th century, a factory in the town made 35,000 pairs of jeans per week for Marks & Spencer, but closed in 2002 with the loss of 400 jobs when M&S sourced from overseas. A new jeans manufacturer—the Hiut Denim Company—opened in 2012, employing some of the original staff and in 2017 became globally recognised for its connection with Meghan Markle.

In 2006 and 2008, the town undertook a coordinated programme of building works, sympathetically restoring many of the shop facades in the town centre. The quayside has been rebuilt with a new civic area and landing stage.

Until 2011, traders in Cardigan were represented by the Chamber of Commerce. Cardigan Traders' Group was set up in that year, attracting half of the members of the Chamber of Commerce. The new group was set to meet in February 2011 to decide how to proceed.

Cardigan was named one of the best places to live in Wales in 2017.

Geography
The majority of the town was north of the river before the 20th century. Afon Mwldan which flows south to the west of the town centre has suffered from pollution. The town and rivers are prone to flooding. An earthquake of magnitude 4.4 was felt in the community on 17 February 2018; this was the biggest UK earthquake in ten years.

Local Glaciolacustrine clay from brickpits in Bath House Road and on the site of King George's field was used for brickmaking until the early 20th century.

Climate
Cardigan experiences a maritime climate with comfortable summers and cold winters.

Typically, fewer than 3 days of the year will reach a value above .

Cardigan Castle

In 1176, Cardigan Castle became the site of the first competitive Eisteddfod. Cardigan also hosted the National Eisteddfod of Wales in 1942 and 1976. The castle was for many years privately owned and became run down and derelict. The town council itself showed little interest in saving it. However, a group of volunteers and the local Catholic priest, Seamus Cunane, working separately, did raise its profile. Ceredigion County Council bought it in 2003. The castle and house underwent restoration in 2014.

The castle is open to the public. There is luxury accommodation for hire, a heritage centre with education facilities, a restaurant, an events and open-air concert area, and there are rooms for hire for classes.

Listed buildings
Including the castle (Grade I-listed) and the old bridge (Grade II*), there are over 100 listed buildings in Cardigan community, most in the town itself.

Demographics
Cardigan is the second largest town in Ceredigion with 4,203 inhabitants (2001), reducing slightly to 4,184 at the 2011 census.

At the 2001 census more than 69% of the residents were recorded as being able to speak or understand spoken Welsh, with 45% able to speak, read and write in the language. In 2011 54.6% were able to speak Welsh. In 1176, and again 800 years later, the National Eisteddfod was held in the town (also in 1942). In 2003 the community, together with the Welsh Language Board, set up a language action plan designed to provide opportunities for people of all ages to get together to speak Welsh.

Local government
Cardigan is an ancient borough which had its own municipal council from the early nineteenth century. In 1889, Cardiganshire County Council was formed, although the former county town was rarely the venue for its meetings. Levi James, one of the town's two inaugural county councillors, was immediately made an alderman and became the second chairman of the council. Cardigan is a significant regional administrative centre for West Wales.

Cardigan Town Council comprises thirteen councillors who represent the local community. Following the 2017 election the council was unique in Wales for having a female majority (seven women, six men).

Amenities 
The town has a hospital, college, modern arts centre (with three-screen cinema), theatre and recently refurbished 19th century guildhall housing market stalls. For shopping there are supermarkets, town centre shops and several trading estates.

Education
Cardigan's college, Coleg Ceredigion, is located north of the town centre and educates 700 full-time and 2,000 part-time students in both Welsh and English languages, and is Ceredigion's only further education college. The college became a constituent college of the University of Wales Trinity Saint David. In a special ceremony at the guildhall, the university's vice-chancellor, Prof Medwin Hughes, chair of the university council, Ven Randolph Thomas and Dr. Brinley Jones, president of UWTSD officially welcomed Coleg Ceredigion to the UWTSD group.

The college and Cardigan Secondary School, Ysgol Uwchradd Aberteifi share the same site. Ysgol Gynradd Gymunedol Aberteifi was established in 2008 when the former Cardigan Infant and Cardigan Junior schools were combined. The school educates more than 300 pupils.

Worship
The parish church is dedicated to St Mary.

Cardigan is the site of Our Lady of Cardigan, a Roman Catholic shrine, also known as the shrine to Our Lady of the Taper.

Other churches include:
Bethania Welsh Baptist Church, on William Street, first built in 1775–76 but modified in 1819, 1843 and finally in 1846–47 to the design of architect Daniel Evans of Cardigan.
Mount Zion Baptist Chapel, which was built in 1878 in mixed Romanesque/Lombardic style, to the design of architect George Morgan of Carmarthen. It is Grade 2 listed.
Tabernacl Methodist Chapel, built in 1760, rebuilt in 1807 and 1832, restored and extended by architect Lloyd Edwards in 1886. The body of the present chapel, dated 1832, is built in Romanesque style but was deeply altered in 1902 with a large projecting central organ chamber, flanking porches and new stucco cladding, and in 1986 when the pyramid roof was modified to a flatter design.

There is also a small Islamic centre on Quay Street called the "Cardigan Islamic Cultural Centre". It serves the local Muslim community in the town.

Leisure activities

There is a leisure centre in the grounds of the college offering sport and fitness facilities, and a swimming pool and leisure complex (a registered charity opened in 1977) in Napier Street. A public library was situated in 'Canolfan Teifi' near the guildhall, but, in July 2017 moved to the local Council Offices on Morgan street.

Sport
Cardigan Rugby Football Club was founded in 1876 and plays in WRU Division Two West. It is a feeder club for the Llanelli Scarlets.

Cardigan Golf Club is a 6,500-yard 18 hole clifftop course at Gwbert, north of the town. The current clubhouse was opened in 1977 but the links course originated with 9 holes in 1895.

A blue plaque was put up at Cardigan Quay in 2018 to honour multiple powerboat champion, boat-builder and commentator Jonathan Jones in his home town.

River

Moorings in the River Teifi are under the control of Afon Teifi Fairways and there is some deepwater mooring on the south bank downstream of the old bridge. Other midstream moorings exist from Cardigan downstream to the estuary and there are occasional slipways on both sides of the river. There is an activity centre by the old bridge for kayaking in the river when tide and river conditions permit.

Cardigan Lifeboat Station is situated at Poppit Sands on the Teifi estuary, having been operational since 1849 apart from the period 1872–1931. Its boathouse and shop are open to the public during the summer months.

Annual events
Barley Saturday, an agricultural event, has been held in the town on the Saturday following the last Friday in April since the 19th century. Historically the farmers from the surrounding area would come to the town to hire workers and to inspect stallions that are put out to stud. In modern times the horses have become the centre of attention. After judging, the horses are paraded through the town followed by vintage tractors, cars and motorbikes.

In August there is a wine and food festival.

Each August (since 2014), British record label Fruits de Mer Records organizes a three-day psychedelic music festival, The Dream of Dr. Sardonicus: A Festival of Psychedelia, which is held at The Cellar Bar in Cardigan.

Transport

The A487 coastal trunk road provides links to the northeast and southwest; the A478 south to Narberth and Tenby and the A484 southeast to Swansea. A bypass was constructed to the southeast of the town in 1989–90, including a new concrete bridge (Priory Bridge) over the River Teifi. Bus services link Cardigan with most nearby towns and villages in Ceredigion, Pembrokeshire and Carmarthenshire.

Cardigan railway station was the terminus of the Whitland and Cardigan Railway. On 2 August 1877, The Whitland and Taff Vale Railway Company obtained authorisation to extend the line to Cardigan. Completion to Cardigan was slow; the opening was finally achieved on 1 September 1886 and on the same day the Great Western Railway took over the working of the line.

The railway station closed to passengers prior to the Beeching Axe on 10 September 1962 but remained open to goods traffic until 27 May 1963. After that, the station remained open as a coal depot until April 1965, staffed by British Railways staff until November 1964. Final closure came on 6 September 1965. The old goods shed marks the site of the former station. A local Welsh language newspaper uses the nickname of the line, Cardi bach, as does the shuttle bus service between Cardigan and New Quay.

The section of old trackbed between Cardigan and Cilgerran is now a footpath and cycle track to the Teifi estuary woodlands and marshes and the Welsh Wildlife Centre.

Notable people

 Elisha Lawrence (1740-1811), American politician and colonel, died in Cardigan
 Charles Symmons (1749–1826), a Welsh poet and priest.
 Kenny Meadows (1790–1874), caricaturist and illustrator, contributed drawings to Punch
 Robert Lewis-Lloyd (1836–1915), rower, barrister, High Sheriff of Radnorshire and umpire of the Boat Race, 1881/88.
 Towyn Jones (1858–1925), clergyman and politician; MP for Carmarthenshire East and later for Llanelli
 Moelwyn Hughes (1897–1955), lawyer, Liberal and Labour politician and MP
 Evelyn Bowen (1911–1994), a Welsh and Canadian actress, director, writer, editor and educator.
 Buddug Verona James (born ca.1955), "Opera Singer, Actress and Butcher"
 David Edwards (1964–2021), musician, singer and writer; lead singer with Datblygu
 Gareth Milton (born ca.1980), actor, born in Aberystwyth and brought up in Cardigan.

Sport 
 Brynmor Williams MBE (born 1951), international rugby union, and professional rugby league footballer.
 Hywel Davies (born 1957), jockey, rode for 16 years with 761 wins, retired 1994.
 John Davies (born 1971), former Welsh rugby union prop with 34 caps for Wales
 Wayne Proctor (born 1972), former rugby union footballer with 274 caps for Llanelli RFC and 39 for Wales
 Owen Evans (born 1989), a Welsh rugby union player
 Jodie Grinham (born 1993), archer, competed at the 2016 Summer Paralympics

See also 
 Gwbert, a nearby coastal settlement
 Moylegrove, a nearby village
 Mwnt, a popular nearby coastal location

References

External links 

 
 Cardigan Town Council website / Safle We Cyngor Tref Aberteifi
 Cardigan history on GENUKI
 2001 Census. Neighbourhood Statistics: Cardigan
 Photographs of Cardigan and surrounding area on Geograph
 Dyfed Archaeological Trust - Towyn Burrows and Gwbert

 
1093 establishments in Europe
11th-century establishments in Wales
Populated places established in the 11th century
Populated coastal places in Wales
Former county towns in Wales
Monasteries dissolved under the English Reformation
Towns in Ceredigion